I Saw Her Standing There is a bootleg compilation album of songs by the English rock band the Beatles. Available as both a 2-CD and a 2-LP set, it is a collection of their early recordings, featuring songs from the band's Hamburg recording sessions, Decca audition and performances from the Cavern Club, as well as their first ever radio interview. Adversely, the album also includes many songs that were not recorded by the Beatles.

CD version
The CD version of the album contains 49 tracks including one radio interview while six songs are heard in two different versions. Moreover, nine songs are unreleased on any official Beatles album but 14 are not performed by the Beatles.

Disc 1 is mainly compiled from recordings credited to rock and roll singer Tony Sheridan and the Beat Brothers.  The German composer and musical conductor Bert Kaempfert, who produced the Beatles' first professional recording sessions backing Tony Sheridan, chose to issue a single credited to the Beat Brothers. Sheridan used this name for all his studio recordings in the early sixties. Only eight songs were recorded by Sheridan with the Beatles in Hamburg and only three of those were issued with this moniker in 1961 - 1962, all included here ("My Bonnie", "The Saints" and "Sweet Georgia Brown"). The five other tracks were released during Beatlemania as the Beatles with Tony Sheridan although the songs "Ain't She Sweet", "If You Love Me, Baby (Take Out Some Insurance On Me, Baby)" and "Nobody's Child" are not included here. All other tracks credited to the Beat Brothers were recorded with other musicians. Of the fifteen songs recorded on 1 January 1962 for their Decca audition, five were included on "Anthology 1", the other ten are heard in this collection. "Some Other Guy" and "Kansas City" were recorded for Granada Television's show "Know the North", filmed by Leslie Woodhead.

Ringo Starr appears only on disc 2 tracks 11–21, including the two songs issued on the group's first British single.

LP version
Due to the limited amount of music that can fit on a vinyl record, the 2-LP version compiles only the highlights of the original CD, and contains 27 songs all recorded by the fledgling British group.

Track listing
The tracks preceded by the symbol ‡ do not feature the Beatles.

CD version

Disc 1
 Tracks 1, 7, 10, 13: Tony Sheridan and the Beatles credited as the Beat Brothers
 Tracks 19-21: credited as the Beatles with Tony Sheridan
 Tracks 2–6, 8, 9, 11, 12, 14–18: Tony Sheridan and the Beat Brothers without the Beatles' involvement
 Tracks 22–24: Teenagers Turn, 7 March 1962
 Tracks 25–27: Here We Go, 11 June 1962
 Track 28: Cavern Club, summer 1962

Disc 2
 Tracks 1–10: Decca demos, recorded 1 January 1962
 Track 11: Cavern Club, 22 August 1962
 Tracks 12–13: Cavern Club 5 September 1962
 Track 14: first radio interview, 27 October 1962
 Tracks 15–19: Cavern Club, October 1962
 Track 20: recorded 4 September 1962 (Ringo Starr on drums)
 Track 21: recorded 11 September 1962 (Andy White on drums)

LP version

References

2013 compilation albums
The Beatles bootleg recordings
The Beatles compilation albums
Compilation albums published posthumously